Food Factor is the FIRST Lego League (FLL) competition for 2011-12; released on September 2. It focuses on food safety and methods to prevent contamination.

This is the first year that the name of the challenge theme of FLL is different from Jr.FLL. Jr.FLL's theme for 2011-12 is Snack Attack.

Project
Teams are tasked with identifying a food item and tracking its journey from creation to consumption. From this, teams identify potential sources of contamination and create solutions to those problems. Teams then share their project with the community and with judges at competition.

Gameplay

The table performance portion of Food Factor is played on a 4 ft by 8 ft field rimmed by wood boards. At competition, two of these fields are placed together to form an 8 ft square. In each -minute match, a team competes on each field with their robot to earn up to 452 points manipulating the mission models.

The touch penalty objects are "good" bacteria models. All 12 are worth 6 points each when located in base, but are removed every time the robot is touched outside of base.

Missions
All of the Food Factor missions relate to various food topics and food safety problems:
Pollution Reversal - 4 points per ball (up to 8 points)
Corn Harvest - up to 9 points
Fishing - up to 18 points
Pizza and Ice Cream - 7 points each (up to 14 points)
Farm Fresh Produce - 9 points
Distant Travel - 9 points
Cooking Time - 14 points
Storage Temperature - 20 points
Pest Removal - 15 points each (up to 30 points)
Refrigerated Ground Transport - up to 20 points
Groceries - 2 points each (up to 24 points)
Disinfect - up to 12 points each (up to 48 points)
Hand Wash/Bacterial - 3 points each (up to 144 points)
Hand Wash/Viral - up to 13 points
Good Bacteria - 6 points each (up to 72 points in total)

References

External links
World Festival results
Official website

FIRST Lego League games
2011 in robotics